Al-Salihiyya was a Palestinian Arab village populated by people traditionally associated with the Ghawarna, a generic exonym denoting inhabitants of the drainage plains of the Hula Valley. It was depopulated during the 1948 War on May 25, 1948, by the Israeli Palmach. It was located in the Safad Subdistrict, 25 km northeast of Safad, at the intersection of the Jordan River and Wadi Tur'an.

History
Canoeing pioneer John MacGregor was taken prisoner by the villagers of Al-Salihiyya during his exploration of the region in January 1869. During his second night in the village he ate with the village sheikh and 50 other men. The meal consisted of "kusskoosoo" which MacGregor described as "a kind of small bean porridge uncommonly good to eat" and was eaten with saucers of buffalo cream. It was served on a communal wooden plate with wooden spoons for the cream. "They all behaved with excellent propriety and good breeding, but without constraint."

In 1881,  during the late Ottoman period, the PEF's Survey of Western Palestine described the village as "a mud village, containing about ninety Moslems; situated on plain of arable land, with march and river near."

British Mandate era
At the time of the British Mandate for Palestine,  the village had a population of 1281, all Muslim except 2 Christians. They occupied a total of 257 houses, according to the 1931 census of Palestine.

A visitor to the village in 1936 noted that the inhabitants, along with those in other Huleh villages, had a "pronounced negroid element" and suggested they may have originated from Sudan or from slaves purchased in Mecca and resold at Ma'an. Their dialect was close to Egyptian Arabic. The village's main industry was harvesting the papyrus groves of Lake Huleh and the manufacture of papyrus matting. The mats were either fine work for interior use or courser work for building construction. The reed huts were made weatherproof in winter by adding further layers. A roof might end up eight or nine mats thick with the walls made up of four or five layers. They kept chickens, geese and buffaloes. The arable land was made difficult to plough by an invasive low growing grass similar to couch grass, called Injeel or Najeel. Some wheat, Indian corn and millet (dura) was being grown. The villagers also caught fish, of which there was an abundance, with drag nets as well as cast nets. They also acted as guides during the duck shooting season. The writer expressed fear for their future. "The whole area has been taken over by Jewish colonists who intend in the near future to drain it and convert it into useful arable land."

In  the 1945 statistics the population was 1,520, all Muslims, owning 4,528 dunams, while Jews owned 789 dunams, and 290 was publicly owned, according to an official land and population survey. Of this,  23 dunams were allocated for plantations and irrigable land, 4,230 for cereals, while 94 dunams were classified as built-up areas.
The village had a mosque  and an elementary school for boys.

1948, aftermath
According to Israeli sources, the village had traditionally been  ‘friendly’ towards the Yishuv. In late May, 1948, the Haganah reported an argument in Salihiya between youngsters and village elders. The youngsters thought it best ‘to approach the Jews and hand over their arms and stay’. The elders, however, feared that if an Arab army nonetheless reached their area, they would be deemed traitors, ‘and the village would be destroyed. According to Haganah sources: ‘They wanted negotiations [with us]. We did not show up. [They became] afraid.’ The village was depopulated on May 25, 1948, by the Palmach's First Battalion during Operation Yiftach.
 
Walid Khalidi described the village remains in 1992: "The village has been obliterated; no trace of it remains. Residents of the settlement of Kefar Blum cultivate the surrounding land."

See also
Marsh Arabs
Al-Mansura
Mallaha

References

Bibliography

External links
Welcome To al-Salihiyya
al-Salihiyya, Zochrot
al-Salihiyya, Villages of Palestine
Survey of Western Palestine, map 4: IAA, Wikimedia commons
al-Salihiyya, from the Khalil Sakakini Cultural Center

Arab villages depopulated during the 1948 Arab–Israeli War
District of Safad